Calen Bullock (born April 30, 2003) is an American football safety for the USC Trojans.

High school career
Bullock attended John Muir High School in Pasadena, California. He played both defensive back and wide receiver in high school. He committed to the University of Southern California (USC) to play college football.

College career
Bullock entered his true freshman season at USC in 2021 as a starter for the opening game due to starter Isaiah Pola-Mao testing positive for Covid-19. Overall he started six of 12 games recording 39 tackles and two interceptions. He entered his sophomore year in 2022 as a starter.

References

External links
USC Trojans bio

Living people
Players of American football from California
American football safeties
USC Trojans football players
Year of birth missing (living people)